Clyde County is one of the 141 Cadastral divisions of the Australian state of New South Wales. It is located between the Bogan River and Barwon River in the area between them where they join. This is the area to the south of Brewarrina, as far east as the Carinda area. A very small part of the Macquarie River and Castlereagh River is also part of the boundary in the north-east.

Clyde County was named in honour of Field Marshal Sir Colin Campbell, Baron Clyde (1792–1863).

Parishes within this county
A full list of parishes found within this county, their current local government area, and mapping coordinates to the approximate centre of each location is as follows:

References

Counties of New South Wales